John Griffith Roberts (11 September 1946 – 4 January 2016) was a Welsh footballer who made nearly 400 appearances in the Football League and won 22 caps for Wales.

Playing career
Born in Abercynon, Rhondda Cynon Taff, Roberts played football for local club Abercynon Athletic while working as a railway fireman. He joined Swansea Town as an apprentice in 1963, turning professional in 1964. Initially a striker who later switched to centre half, he moved to Northampton Town in 1967 and then Arsenal in 1969. He played for Arsenal for three seasons, including 18 appearances in the 1970–71 season, when Arsenal won the First Division title, thus earning him a championship medal. Roberts however did not play in the FA Cup Final the same year, which Arsenal also won to complete the Double.

Roberts left Arsenal in 1972, having played a total of 81 matches, scoring five goals. He went on to have spells at Birmingham City, Wrexham and Hull City before trying his hand as player-manager of Oswestry Town. He also won 22 caps with Wales.

Later career
He went on to work as a stationery salesman and as a driving instructor.

Roberts' death at the age of 69 was reported on 4 January 2016.

References
General

Specific

1946 births
2016 deaths
Welsh footballers
Wales under-23 international footballers
Wales international footballers
People from Abercynon
Sportspeople from Rhondda Cynon Taf
Swansea City A.F.C. players
Northampton Town F.C. players
Arsenal F.C. players
Birmingham City F.C. players
Wrexham A.F.C. players
Hull City A.F.C. players
English Football League players
Oswestry Town F.C. managers
Oswestry Town F.C. players
Welsh football managers
Association football defenders